Sekove Naqiolevu is a Fijian lawyer and Solomon Islands judge.  Naiqiolevu, a former Chief Magistrate of Fiji, was appointed as a judge of the High Court and Appeal Court of the Solomon Islands on 1 April 2005.

Naqiolevu has participated in the 11-nation RAMSI mission since 2003.

References

Year of birth missing (living people)
Living people
Fijian judges on the courts of the Solomon Islands
Chief Magistrates of Fiji
I-Taukei Fijian people